Marino Morikawa (born 1977) is a Peruvian-Japanese environmental scientist. He is known for environmental work in Peru.

Early life and education
Born in Chancay in Peru, Morikawa has a master's degree in Interdisciplinary Biodiplomacy and a doctorate in Environmental Sciences from Tsukuba University in Japan.

Career
His work became well-known when featured in a National Geographic news report. The report covered his work on the restoration of Lake El Cascajo in Chancay, Peru, his home town. 

Morikawa also founded his own company, Nanoplus 7, which is dedicated to the decontamination of bodies of water. Morikawa has worked on up to 30 habitats around the world. Currently, Morikawa is working on the decontamination effort of Chira River in the Ecuadorian Andes, and lakes Titicaca, Huacachina and Alalay in Peru.

References 

1977 births
Living people
21st-century Peruvian scientists
21st-century Japanese scientists